The Missouri and North Arkansas  was a railroad in Missouri and Arkansas from 1906 to 1946.

History
The railroad begun as the Eureka Springs Railway in 1883 as a line from the St. Louis–San Francisco Railway in Seligman, MO, reaching the resort town of Eureka Springs, AR in 1883.

The railroad was extended east, reaching Harrison, AR in 1901, including a branch from Freeman to Berryville, AR. Leslie, AR was reached in 1903, Kensett, AR in 1908, and on to Helena, AR in 1909. In addition, the railroad was extended northwest from Wayne, MO to Neosho, MO in 1908. This section was reached using trackage rights from the St. Louis-San Francisco Railway between Seligman and Wayne, Missouri. Joplin, MO was reached using trackage rights via the Kansas City Southern Railway (KCS) from Neosho, Missouri.

In August 1914, a steam locomotive owned by the KCS collided with a M&NA doodlebug, killing thirty-eight passengers and five crew members. In March 1918, the Arkansas Supreme Court ruled that the KCS and MN&A should share liability and pay their own costs.

See also
 Bellefonte station

References

 

American companies established in 1906
Defunct Arkansas railroads
Defunct Missouri railroads
Joplin, Missouri
Railway companies disestablished in 1946
Railway companies established in 1906
Standard gauge railways in the United States
Transportation in Barry County, Missouri
Transportation in Boone County, Arkansas
Transportation in Monroe County, Arkansas
Transportation in Newton County, Missouri
Transportation in Phillips County, Arkansas
Transportation in Searcy County, Arkansas
Transportation in White County, Arkansas
Transportation in Woodruff County, Arkansas